The Montenegro men's national under-20 basketball team is a national basketball team of Montenegro, administered by the Basketball Federation of Montenegro. It represents the country in men's international under-20 basketball competitions.

FIBA U20 European Championship participations

See also
Montenegro men's national basketball team
Montenegro men's national under-18 basketball team
Montenegro women's national under-20 basketball team

References

External links
Archived records of Montenegro team participations

Basketball in Montenegro
U
Men's national under-20 basketball teams